Diospyros acuminata is a tree in the Ebony family which is endemic to Sri Lanka.

References

acuminata
Flora of Sri Lanka